21st ADG Awards
February 11, 2017

Period Film:
Hidden Figures

Fantasy Film:
Passengers

Contemporary Film:
La La Land

The 21st Art Directors Guild Excellence In Production Design Awards, took place on February 11, 2017 at the Hollywood & Highland Center Ray Dolby Ballroom in Hollywood, honoring the best production designers of 2016. Nominations were announced on January 5.

Winners and nominees

Film
 Period Film:
 Wynn Thomas – Hidden Figures
 Santo Loquasto – Café Society
 David Gropman – Fences
 Barry Robinson – Hacksaw Ridge
 Jess Gonchor – Hail, Caesar!
 Jean Rabasse – Jackie

 Fantasy Film:
 Guy Hendrix Dyas – Passengers
 Patrice Vermette – Arrival
 Charles Wood – Doctor Strange
 Stuart Craig – Fantastic Beasts and Where to Find Them
 Doug Chiang and Neil Lamont – Rogue One: A Star Wars Story

 Contemporary Film:
 David Wasco – La La Land
 Tom Duffield – Hell or High Water
 Chris Kennedy – Lion
 Ruth De Jong – Manchester by the Sea
 Shane Valentino – Nocturnal Animals

Television
 One-Hour Period or Fantasy Single-Camera Television Series:
 Nathan Crowley – Westworld (for "The Original")
 Martin Childs – The Crown (for "Wolferton Splash", "Hyde Park Corner", "Smoke and Mirrors")
 Deborah Riley – Game of Thrones (for "Blood of My Blood", "The Broken Man", "No One")
 Drew Boughton – The Man in the High Castle (for "The Tiger's Cave", "Land O' Smiles", "Fallout")
 Chris Trujillo – Stranger Things (for "Chapter One: The Vanishing of Will Byers", "Chapter Three: Holly, Jolly", "Chapter Eight: The Upside Down")

 One-Hour Contemporary Single-Camera Television Series:
 Anastasia White – Mr. Robot (for "eps2.0_unm4sk-pt1.tc", "eps2.4_m4ster-slave.aes", "eps2.9_pyth0n-pt1.p7z")
 Tony Fanning – Better Call Saul (for "Inflatable", "Fifi", "Klick")
 Tim Galvin – Bloodline (for "Part 16", "Part 21")
 Steve Arnold – House of Cards (for "Chapter 41", "Chapter 47", "Chapter 48")
 Dave Blass – Preacher (for "See", "South Will Rise Again", "Finish the Song")

Half Hour Single-Camera Television Series:
 Tommaso Ortino – Mozart in the Jungle (for "Now I Will Sing")
 Bruce Robert Hill – The Last Man on Earth (for "Pitch Black", "The Power of Power", "Mama's Hideaway")
 Richard Toyon – Silicon Valley (for "Two in the Box", "Bachmanity Insanity", "Daily Active Users")
 Cat Smith – Transparent (for "If I Were a Bell")
 Jim Gloster – Veep (for "Kissing Your Sister")

 Multi-Camera Series:
 Glenda Rovello – The Great Indoors (for "Pilot")
 Glenda Rovello – 2 Broke Girls (for "And the 80's Movie", "And the Godmama Drama", "And the Two Openings: Part Two")
 Greg Grande – Baby Daddy (for "Love & Carriage", "Room-Mating", "Stupid Cupid")
 John Shaffner – The Big Bang Theory (for "The Positive Negative Reaction", "The Big Bear Precipitation", "The Fermentation Bifurcation")
 John Shaffner – The Ranch (for "Leavin's Been Comin' (For a Long, Long Time)")

Television Movie or Limited Series:
 Patrizia von Brandenstein – The Night Of (for "The Beach")
 Andrew Murdock – American Horror Story: Roanoke (for "Chapter 4")
 Joel Collins, James Foster, and Nicholas Palmer – Black Mirror (for "Nosedive", "Playtest", "San Junipero")
 Jeffrey Mossa – The People v. O. J. Simpson: American Crime Story (for "100% Not Guilty", "Marcia, Marcia, Marcia", "Manna from Heaven")
 Arwel W. Jones – Sherlock: The Abominable Bride

Variety, Reality or Competition Series:
 Keith Raywood, Eugene Lee, Akira Yoshimura, and N. Joseph DeTullio – Saturday Night Live (for "Larry David/The 1975", "Peter Dinklage/Gwen Stefani", "Tom Hanks/Lady Gaga")
 Mercedes Younger – American Grit (for "Ruck Up")
 Karen Weber – The Ellen DeGeneres Show (for "Ellen's Halloween Show")
 Schuyler Telleen – Portlandia (for "Weirdo Beach")
 Eugene Lee and Peter Baran – The Tonight Show Starring Jimmy Fallon (for "Ep. 0417", "Ep. 0461", "Ep. 0493")
 Anton Goss and James Pearse Connelly – The Voice (for "The Blind Auditions, Part 3", "The Battles Premiere, Part 2")

Awards or Event Special:
 Hannah Beachler – Beyoncé: Lemonade
 Tamlyn Wright and Baz Halpin – 68th Primetime Emmy Awards
 David Korins – Grease: Live
 Derek McLane – Hairspray Live!
 Derek McLane – The Oscars

Short Format: Web Series, Music Video or Commercial:
 James Chinlund – "iPhone 7: Balloons"
 Ruth De Jong – "Adidas: Basketball Needs Creators"
 JC Molina – Beyoncé: Lemonade: "6 Inch"
 Jason Hougaard – Beyoncé: Lemonade: "Denial"
 Jason Hougaard – Beyoncé: Lemonade: "Hold Up"

References

External links
 The winners and nominees on the official website

2016 film awards
2016 guild awards
Art Directors Guild Awards
2016 in American cinema